C49 is a secondary route in the Caprivi Strip in Namibia, which leaves and rejoins the B8, at Katima Mulilo and Kongola, respectively.

The C49 serves the communities of: Chinchimane, Linyanti, Sikwalo, Mantemwa, Dipito, Muneambuanas, and Luzibalule.

References 

Roads in Namibia